Eagle Ribs Mountain is located in the Lewis Range, Glacier National Park in the U.S. state of Montana.

See also
 Mountains and mountain ranges of Glacier National Park (U.S.)

References

Mountains of Flathead County, Montana
Eagle Ribs
Lewis Range
Mountains of Montana